Shelter Island Sound is a body of water in Suffolk County, New York, at the eastern end of Long Island, between the North and South Forks of Long Island, adjoining  Shelter Island.  The bay is surrounded by Little Peconic Bay to the west, Noyack Bay to the south, and Gardiners Bay to the east.

External links
NOAA Chart that includes Shelter Island Sound

Straits of New York (state)
Bodies of water of Suffolk County, New York